Robert Henry Allerton (March 20, 1873 – December 22, 1964), born in Chicago, Illinois, United States, was the son and heir of First National Bank of Chicago co-founder Samuel Allerton.  A philanthropist for most of his life, he left Allerton Garden, the Honolulu Academy of Art, the Art Institute of Chicago, and Robert Allerton Park as legacies for the public to enjoy.

Robert Allerton enjoyed traveling to countries around the world where he would buy statues and other works of art which were placed on his estate ″The Farms″ in Piatt County, Illinois. More than 100 statues and some smaller items were left in 1946 when the University of Illinois received the estate now called Robert Allerton Park as a gift. Most of these can still be found there.

Early life
Robert Henry Allerton was born on March 20, 1873, as the second child and only son to Samuel Waters Allerton (1828–1914) and Pamilla Thompson Allerton (1840–1880). Through an entirely paternal line, Robert Henry Allerton was descended from Isaac Allerton, an English Puritan who came to America on the Mayflower in 1620.  Samuel Allerton was a self-made man who made his millions in land, livestock, banking, and other commercial enterprises. Pamilla Allerton died in 1880, five days before Robert's 7th birthday. Two years later, Samuel Allerton married Agnes Thompson, Pamilla's younger sister. Agnes Thompson Allerton (1858–1924) became mother, friend, and cultural mentor for her stepson/nephew. She kindled his interests in literature, music, gardening, and above all, visual arts.

The Allertons lived on Prairie Avenue in Chicago, which was the most fashionable residential street in that city in the late 1800s. The Allertons were neighbors of Marshall Field, the Pullmans, Kimballs, and Armours.  Robert attended Allen Academy and Harvard School in Chicago, after which he and friend Frederic Clay Bartlett (1873−1953), were sent east to St. Paul's School, a prestigious college prep school in Concord, New Hampshire. The young Chicagoans decided not to go on to college, but rather to study art in Europe.

From 1894 to 1896 they studied at the Bayerische Akademie der Schönen Künste (Royal Bavarian Academy of Art) in Munich, Germany and the Académie Julian in Paris. After several years of study in Europe Allerton became dissatisfied with his abilities as an artist, burned his paintings and returned home to Illinois. Frederic Bartlett went on to become a professional artist.

In 1922 Allerton met John Gregg (1899–1986), an orphan and aspiring architect, who worked for the society architect David Adler in Chicago during the 1920s. After the stock market crash of 1929 Adler′s work diminished and Gregg came to live at Allerton′s estate as landscape architect and business manager, a salaried position. Allerton and Gregg became lifelong companions. After a change in Illinois law in 1959, Allerton legally adopted Gregg as his son although Gregg didn′t adopt the Allerton name until after Robert′s death in 1964. Following Robert Allerton′s death on 22 December 1964, according to his wishes John scattered his ashes on Lawai Bay, Kauai, Hawaii. When John died on 1 May 1986 his ashes were also scattered on the bay. It is believed that Allerton and Gregg were involved in a homosexual relationship, at a time when American society was not accepting of such relationships. If so, they were closeted. Same-sex adult adoption had been a method of legally establishing relationships utilized by couples in the time before the legalization of same-sex marriages and unions.

"The Farms"
Allerton's estate began in 1897 when Allerton decided to become a farmer. By 1914 his "farm" had grown to over 12,000 acres and became known as "The Farms". Now called Robert Allerton Park, it is owned and operated by the University of Illinois near Monticello, Illinois. The botanical journal Allertonia and the two estate parks are named after Robert Allerton. The main building of the Art Institute of Chicago, where he served as the honorary president and trustee, was renamed the Allerton Building in his honor in 1968.

Hawaii
The former Hawaiian Royal tropical estate, located on the island of Kauai in Hawaii, is now called the Allerton Garden. After John Gregg Allerton's death it became part of the National Tropical Botanical Garden, with public tours.

See also
 Robert Allerton Park ("The Farms," Illinois)
 Allerton Garden (Kaua'i, Hawaii)

References

Further reading
 Nicholas L. Syrett: An open secret : the family story of Robert & John Gregg Allerton, Chicago : The University of Chicago Press, 2021, ISBN

External links
 Bruce Shenitz. 2007.  The Garden of Eden. Minus Eve.  Out September 2007: 84-90.
 Allerton Garden
 John Gregg Allerton Memoir

American landscape and garden designers
Philanthropists from Illinois
American art collectors
American gardeners
1873 births
1964 deaths
Businesspeople from Chicago
People from Kauai County, Hawaii
People from Monticello, Illinois
LGBT people from Illinois
LGBT people from Hawaii
Inductees of the Chicago LGBT Hall of Fame